Chemistry: A European Journal is a weekly peer-reviewed scientific journal that covers all areas of chemistry and related fields. It is published by Wiley-VCH on behalf of Chemistry Europe. The editor-in-chief is Haymo Ross.

According to the Journal Citation Reports, the journal has a 2021 impact factor of 5.020.

References

External links 

Chemistry journals
Wiley-VCH academic journals
Weekly journals
English-language journals
Chemistry Europe academic journals
Publications established in 1995